Croton-on-Hudson is a village in Westchester County, New York, United States. The population was 8,327 at the 2020 United States census over 8,070 at the 2010 census. It is located in the town of Cortlandt as part of New York City's northern suburbs. The village was incorporated in 1898.

History
People lived from at latest about 7000 BC in what would become the village. The Kitchawanc tribe, part of the Wappinger Confederacy of the Algonquian peoples, signed a peace treaty with the newly arriving Dutch people at Croton Point in 1645, now commemorated by a plaque in the park there.

Stephanus van Cortlandt began acquiring land in the area in 1677 (the year he became mayor of New York City) to create a manor. It was granted by royal patent in 1697 as the Manor of Cortlandt, including the area known as Croton Landing where the Croton River meets the Hudson River, where the manor house was built. A 1718 census reports 91 inhabitants including Dutch settlers and English Quakers. People worked the manor primarily as farmers or millers.

In the mid- to late 1800s first the Croton Dam, then the New Croton Dam, and the Croton Aqueduct were built on the Croton River to supply New York City, along with the New York Central Railroad station on the Hudson River. Many Irish, Italian and German immigrants moved to the area to work on those projects, increasing the population dramatically. By 1898, when the Village incorporated, the population was 1,000 people, growing to 1,700 people in the early 1900s.

In 1846 work began on a Hudson River rail line from Poughkeepsie to New York City. Clifford Harmon, a realtor, purchased 550 acres of land next to the village  of Croton in 1903. He gave part of the land to the New York Central Railroad to build a train station, on the condition that the station would forever be named after him. Today it is called the Croton-Harmon station of the Metro-North Railroad and of Amtrak. In 1906, the station became a major service facility for the railroad. The station expanded even further in 1913, when it became the stop at which electric trains from New York City switched to steam engines. The station still serves this purpose, but for diesel locomotives instead of steam engines.

Harmon thrived as an artist's colony alongside the village, while the neighboring Mount Airy community evolved from Quakers to Greenwich Village artists and writers by the early 1900s. Mount Airy was home to many early members of the American Communist Party. In 1932 Harmon and most of Mount Airy were incorporated into the village.

Geography
Croton-on-Hudson is located at  (41.204228, -73.886177) on the shores of the Hudson River. The zip codes are 10520 and 10521.

Demographics

As of the census of 2000, there were 7,606 people, 2,798 households, and 2,050 families residing in the village. The racial makeup of the village was 91.5% white, 1.9% African American, 0.26% Native American, 2.06% Asian, 0.01% Pacific Islander, 2.58% from other races, and 1.70% from two or more races. Hispanic or Latino of any race were 6.93% of the population.

There were 2,798 households, out of which 38.7% had children under the age of 18 living with them, 62.5% were married couples living together, 8.2% had a female householder with no husband present, and 26.7% were non-families. 22.2% of all households were made up of individuals, and 7.7% had someone living alone who was 65 years of age or older. The average household size was 2.65 and the average family size was 3.11.

In the village, the population was spread out, with 25.7% under the age of 18, 4.5% from 18 to 24, 30.1% from 25 to 44, 26.1% from 45 to 64, and 13.6% who were 65 years of age or older. The median age was 40 years. For every 100 females, there were 90.8 males. For every 100 females age 18 and over, there were 86.7 males.

The median income for a household in the village was $84,744, and the median income for a family was $100,182. Males had a median income of $65,938 versus $46,029 for females. The per capita income for the village was $39,441. About 1.8% of families and 3.4% of the population were below the poverty line, including 3.2% of those under age 18 and 1.2% of those age 65 or over.

Government and politics 
As of the regular 2017 elections
 Mayor: Brian Pugh
 Trustees: Sherry Horowitz, Amy Attias, Ann Gallelli

Economy 
Croton-on-Hudson's economy has historically thrived on the Metro North train station that up until the early 1980s served as the point at which northbound trains would exchange their electric engines for other modes of conveyance. During those days, the train station and its super-adjacent area was known as Harmon. Because maintenance of diesel and steam engines was then very labor-intensive, there were many workers whose needs were served by abundant service businesses, such as restaurants and bars. Because of the separate development of both the Harmon and the Mt. Airy communities, there were originally two commercial districts—one centered on Grand Street, and the other in Harmon—though in recent years the two have merged into a single sprawling commercial district. There is also a North Riverside commercial district serving communities along Riverside Drive, Brook Street, Grand Street, and Bank Street.

After the New York Central Railroad folded into Penn Central in 1968, Croton-on-Hudson's economy slowly stagnated. Although Croton-Harmon station still served as the main transfer point northbound between local and express trains, the laborers who had earlier fueled a bustling service economy were no longer present in Harmon. The exodus of labor during the early 1970s was compounded by the stagflation that was a result of higher oil prices and skyrocketing interest rates.

There has been an ongoing effort since the early 1990s to develop the riverfront for recreational use. Among the accomplishments are a pedestrian bridge spanning U.S. Route 9 and NY 9A between the lower village and Senasqua Park, the Crossining pedestrian footbridge across the Croton River, the bicycle trail extensions around Half Moon Bay Condominiums, rehabilitation of the "Picture Tunnel" (repaving and closing it to cars), and acquisition and clearing of the Croton Landing property. In addition, Croton Point Park is also along the riverfront.

Transportation

The town is a stop for Amtrak's Empire Service, Adirondack, Maple Leaf, Ethan Allen Express, and Lake Shore Limited routes, as well the MTA's Metro-North Hudson Line service, both at the Croton-Harmon station. Metro-North's main shops and yards are also located here.

Croton-on-Hudson is served by US 9,  NY 9A, and NY 129.

Culture 
Croton Point Park hosts Clearwater's Great Hudson River Revival, a yearly folk music, art and environmental festival.

Croton-on-Hudson has an annual event called the Summerfest. Every year the central business district (with corners at the municipal building, Grand Street fire house and Croton-Harmon High School) is closed to automobile traffic for music, American food, local fund raisers, traveling, and local artists. 

Since 1981 Croton-on-Hudson has been the home of the annual Harry Chapin Run Against Hunger, a 10k race and Fun Run, held on a Sunday afternoon in October.

Every weekend in October, people visit Van Cortlandt Manor to see the Blaze.  Started in 2005, the Blaze consists of thousands of pumpkins which are hollowed out by volunteers but carved by a creative team.

The Asbury United Methodist Church and Bethel Chapel and Cemetery, Croton North Railroad Station, and St. Augustine's Episcopal Church Complex are listed on the National Register of Historic Places. Van Cortlandt Manor is listed as a National Historic Landmark.

From the 1910s to the 1960s, Croton was a popular location for the summer homes of American communists, socialists and other radicals and many important artists and writers. This gave the Mt. Airy area in Croton the nickname "Red Hill"

Croton-on-Hudson is the original home of the Hudson Institute, a key Cold War think tank where the "Mutual Assured Destruction" strategy for nuclear war deterrence was developed.

The village is home to one of a handful operating "dummy lights" in the United States, located downtown at the intersection of Old Post Road South and Grand Street.  It is a traffic signal on a pedestal which sits in the middle of an intersection, dating back to the 1920s.  Two others are located in New York State, in Beacon and Canajoharie.

Religious organizations 
 Asbury United Methodist Church - a Methodist church 
 Briarcliff, Ossining, Croton Unitarian Universalist Fellowship - a Unitarian Universalist location 
 Community Bible Church - a non-denominational church located near the Teatown area 
 Emin Society - Croton-on-Hudson is the North East American base 
 Holy Name of Mary - a Catholic church 
 Our Savior Lutheran - a Lutheran church 
 St. Augustine's - an Episcopal church 
 Temple Israel of Northern Westchester - a Reform Judaism temple 
 The Church of Jesus Christ of Latter-day Saints (LDS Church) has a local congregation located near the Teatown area

Recreation 
Parks and sites of interest in the community include:
 Croton Dam on the Croton River overlooks the New Croton Reservoir that it creates (outside the village limits in the Town of Cortlandt).
 Croton Point Park is a 508-acre county park on a large peninsula in the Tappan Zee segment of the Hudson River.
 Van Cortlandt Manor is a National Historic Landmark established at the mouth of the Croton River at the Hudson River on the Tappan Zee.
 Teatown Lake Reservation, a 1000-acre preserve and conservation center (outside the village limits within the towns of Yorktown and Cortlandt).
 Jane E. Lytle Memorial Croton Arboretum conserves over 20 acres of wetlands and woods.
 Brinton Brook Sanctuary is Saw Mill River Audubon's largest sanctuary, covering 156 acres and offering over three miles of hiking trails through a variety of habitats.
 Croton Landing Park is a 12.2 acre park containing a 2/3 mile scenic walkway along the Hudson River. The walkway ends at a 9/11 memorial built around a beam from the World Trade Center.
 Senasqua Park is a 4.6 acre Hudson River waterfront park containing a sailing school and playground, with walkways to Croton Point and Croton Landing Park.
 Silver Lake Park is a 13.5 acre park with a beach along the Croton River with trails to Carrie E. Tompkins elementary school (CET) and the north tip of Cleveland Drive.
 Black Rock Park is a 10.5 acre park on the Croton River, near New York State Route 129 (NY 129), within a mile or so of the Croton Dam, used mostly for fly fishing and picnics. It is within 100 yards of a historic bridge which dates from the 1800s on Quaker Hill Road.
 Mayo's Landing is a 1.1 acre park along the Croton River.
 Paradise Island Park is a 22.2 acre undeveloped island in the Croton River.

Notable people 

 Alan Abelson, financial writer for Barron's
 Guy Adami
 Manny Albam, composer, arranger, RCA and Solid State Records
 Frances E. Allen, computer scientist, seminal work in compilers, program optimization, and parallel computing 
 Kristen Anderson-Lopez, American film and stage lyricist 
 Nenad Bach
 Isabel Chapin Barrows, physician, ophthalmologist, professor, congressional stenographer – many "first woman as" achievements 
 Helen Purdy Beale, "mother of plant virology and serology", inventor of standard serology tools used in scientific research and medical diagnosis 
 Charles H. Bennett
 George Biddle
 Ramon Bloomberg, artist and music video director
 Louise Bryant
 Alexander Calder, artist
 Isadora Duncan, ballet dancer
 Crystal Eastman
 Max Eastman
 Irving Fierstein, American impressionist painter and designer
 Carl Folta, Viacom executive
 Allen Funt
 William Gaddis
 Josh Greenfeld
 Hananiah Harari, American modernist painter and illustrator
 Mary Hamilton, activist
 Robb Hanrahan
 Lorraine Hansberry, playwright and author
 Lee Elhardt Hays
 Lawrence R. Jacobs, American political scientist
 Joseph Heller
 Sally Jacobsen, first woman as international editor of the Associated Press
 Stephen Jardine
 Herman Kahn
 Roger Kahn, author of The Boys of Summer
 Ira Kaplan, songwriter and lead guitarist for Yo La Tengo
 Herbert Keppler
 Scott Levine, astronomy author and communicator known for his work with BBC Sky at Night Magazine, Sky and Telescope, EarthSky and other outlets.
 Jeff McCarthy
 Audra McDonald
 John Mearsheimer
 Richard Merkin, American painter and illustrator
 Edna St. Vincent Millay
 Ward Morehouse
 Jessye Norman
 Elmar Oliveira
 Jerry Pinkney, a Caldecott award-winning children's book illustrator
 John Silas Reed
 Michael Robinson (rabbi), activist for civil rights and human rights
 Darlene Rodriguez
 Edward Rondthaler
 Thomas Secunda, co-founder and vice-chairman of Bloomberg L.P.
 Gordon Sheer
 Upton Sinclair, author
 Nicholas Springer
 Peter Strauss
 Gloria Swanson, motion picture actress
 Hannah Tompkins, American painter and illustrator
 Joe Vasta
 Donald Wallance

In film and television
Films shot in Croton-on-Hudson include:
 Daylight: In the opening sequence, the trucks that end up destroying the tunnel drive through Croton-on-Hudson (the steps of the New Croton Dam are visible) and several other towns in Westchester County, New York
 Guess What We Learned in School Today? – Mentioned in "Big Day Coming: Yo La Tengo and the Rise of Indie Rock"
 Reds: The main characters were supposed to be in Croton-on-Hudson, but their cottage there was actually filmed in England.
 Shriek of the Mutilated (1974) (alternate titles: Mutilated, Scream of the Snowbeast)
 Ganja & Hess
 Tenderness
 The Toxic Avenger Part II
 War of the Worlds: Shot at Croton Point.
 30 Rock: The episode "Retreat to Move Forward" from the third season was set in Croton-on-Hudson. The episode features the catchphrase 'what happens in Croton-on-Hudson stays in Croton-on-Hudson.'
 Madam Secretary 2016, filmed on the Croton River just below Quaker Bridge 
 An Episode of the NBC series Kings was shot at the Croton Dam. The waterfall and bridge leading to Croton Gorge Park are clearly visible and utilized in multiple scenes.
 General Hospital: A story starting in 2018 involving Sonny Corinthos' start in the mafia involves a him burying a former mob boss in Croton in the 1980s.
 Scenes for the film Gods Behaving Badly were shot at Croton Point Park in 2011.
 Was incorrectly referenced as "Croton on the Hudson" in Mad About You, an American situation comedy.
 The Croton Reservoir was referenced in the American cartoon UnderDog (1964–1973), and the episode was the one where Simon Bar-Sinister is attempting to steal the world's water.
 The Croton-Harmon Station is used as set of one scene of the 2017 movie You Were Never Really Here.

See also
Mount Airy, New York

References

External links
 
 
 Village of Croton-on-Hudson official website
 
  Friends of Croton History, Croton Friends of History, a local historical society that offers programs and shares research both online and at local library

Villages in New York (state)
Villages in Westchester County, New York
New York (state) populated places on the Hudson River